Soul Cycle is an album by pianist Cedar Walton, which was recorded in 1969 and released on the Prestige label.

Reception

AllMusic reviewer Scott Yanow stated: "Walton was trying to widen his audience a bit at the time — not a bad goal, except that he felt he had to water down his music on a few of these numbers. A mixed bag".

Track listing 
All compositions by Cedar Walton, except as indicated
 "Sundown Express" - 6:49
 "Quiet Dawn" - 7:31 
 "Pensativa" (Clare Fischer) - 6:28
 "My Cherie Amour" (Henry Cosby, Sylvia Moy, Stevie Wonder) - 4:13 
 "Easy Walker" (Billy Taylor) - 8:03   
 "I Should Care" (Sammy Cahn, Axel Stordahl, Paul Weston) - 3:26

Personnel 
Cedar Walton - piano, electric piano
James Moody - tenor saxophone, flute
Rudy Stevenson - guitar
Reggie Workman - bass
Albert Heath - drums

Production
Don Schlitten - producer
Danfort Griffith - engineer

References 

Cedar Walton albums
1970 albums
Prestige Records albums
Albums produced by Don Schlitten